Balatonring was to be a  long motor racing circuit, located in Sávoly, Hungary near Central and South Europe's biggest lake Balaton. Spain's Balatonring Zrt was to operate the racing circuit with 70% share owned by Worldwide Circuit Management S.L. (WCM) and Magyar Turizmus Zrt. (Hungarian Tourism Board) owning 30%. Spanish investment group Sedesa would have been the constructor at a cost of €80 million and seating for 110,000 to 140,000 would have been constructed.

Construction work on the 200 million Euro project had started on 6 November 2008, and the facility was due to host its first MotoGP race on 20 September 2009. However, on 11 March 2009, motogpmatters.com reported that the Hungarian round would be canceled due to problems related to the Financial crisis of 2007–2010. The circuit would not be completed in time for the September 20th race. The first Hungarian GP was scheduled to take place in September 2010.

On 18 March 2010 the Hungarian motorcycle Grand Prix was cancelled as the FIM said the construction work that needed to be done will not be done in time for the event. It was replaced by the Aragon motorcycle Grand Prix in MotorLand Aragón.

As of November 2012, the plot has been on auction for a month. The project has accumulated a total debt of HUF 3.5 bn (USD 16,000,000) and the plot is being sold for HUF 1.5 bn (USD 6,800,000). Nothing can be seen from the track line as weeds have grown over it.

References

External links
Balatonring non-official homepage
German Blog about Balatonring

Motorsport venues in Hungary
Unbuilt sports venues
Proposed buildings and structures in Hungary